The Liborajdea is a small left tributary of the Danube in Romania. It flows into the Danube near the village Liborajdea.

References

Rivers of Romania
Rivers of Caraș-Severin County